Japanese oak wilt (also called mortality of oak trees in Japan) is a fungal disease caused by Raffaelea quercivora fungus affecting by oak trees. In 1998, Japanese plant pathologists group was isolation, inoculation and reisolation the dead tree. It is the first disease known that Raffaela fungus cause plant disease.

Symptoms
The first obvious symptom was that the leaves wilted, and many small holes appeared on the trunk. The leaves turned to red and died back quickly (1 or 2 weeks), and finally the tree died. If you cut the dead tree, you would discover the xylem had been  discolored to brown.

Mechanism
The oak trees react plugging their xylem with gum and tyloses for blocking the fungus spreading. It's the same reaction of elm vs. Opiostoma fungus at Dutch elm disease.

Treatment
JOW treatment is resemble other fungus insect vector diseases such as Dutch elm disease or Pine wilt.

Exterminate beetle 
The majority of this disease treatment is cut down the dead oak trees, and killed the vector ambrosia beetles by burned timber or infused insecticide.

Exterminate fungus 
Some fungicide are developing and trying to inoculation.

See also
 Bark beetle, Ambrosia beetle

Raffaelea disease 
 Laurel wilt - caused by R. lauricola, and R. canadensis
 Korean oak wilt - caused by R. quercus-mongolicae

Several tree wilt disease in the world 
 Dutch elm disease
 Pine wilt

Mortality of oaks 
 Oak wilt
 Sudden oak death

References

Further reading
Kamata, Naoto; Esaki, Koujiro; Kato, Kenryu; Oana, Hisahito; Igeta, Yutaka; Komura, Ryotaro 2007. Japanese oak wilt as a newly emerged forest pest in Japan: why does a symbiotic ambrosia fungus kill host trees?. In: Gottschalk, Kurt W., ed. Proceedings, 17th U.S. Department of Agriculture interagency research forum on gypsy moth and other invasive species 2006; Gen. Tech. Rep. NRS-P-10. Newtown Square, PA: U.S. Department of Agriculture, Forest Service, Northern Research Station: 1-3.

Fungal tree pathogens and diseases